Bismark "Nana" Adjei-Boateng (born 10 May 1994) is a Ghanaian professional footballer who plays as a midfielder for Liga I club CFR Cluj.

Career
Boateng was signed by Manchester City F.C. in 2012, and immediately loaned alongside Enock Kwakwa to the Norwegian Tippeligaen club Strømsgodset Toppfotball, as the pair were not eligible for a UK work permit. The midfielder made his debut for Strømsgodset on 12 August 2012 in a 4–0 loss against Tromsø IL. He scored his first and second goal for the club in the match against Sogndal IL on 16 May 2013, and played an important part in the team that won the 2013 Tippeligaen league title, with 17 matches and seven goals. After the good spell at Strømsgodset, he renewed his contract with Manchester City, and was loaned out to the Norwegian club again.

However, after receiving an ankle injury during training in September 2013, he was kept out of action until June 2014. He came back and helped his team secure fourth place in the 2014 Tippeligaen, with 11 matches and two goals. In February 2015, Manchester City agreed to a third loan spell for Boateng, this time for the whole 2015 season. He signed another full-season loan with the Norwegian club on 5 January 2016.

Boateng signed for Major League Soccer club Colorado Rapids in January 2017. He scored his first MLS goal on 11 August 2018—a dramatic stoppage-time goal that gave the Rapids a 2–1 win over the San Jose Earthquakes. On 12 July 2019, the club and Adjei-Boateng mutually agreed to terminate his contract with the club so that the player could "return to Europe to deal with a family issue".

In December 2019, Boateng signed for Veikkausliiga side Kuopion Palloseura on a one-year contract with an option for another year.

Career statistics

Club

Honours

Strømsgodset
Tippeligaen: 2013

KuPS
Finnish Cup: 2021

CFR Cluj
Liga I: 2021–22
Supercupa României runner-up: 2022

Individual
Veikkausliiga Midfielder of the Year: 2020
Veikkausliiga Team of the Year: 2020
Liga I Team of the Season: 2021–22

References

1994 births
Living people
Footballers from Accra
Ghanaian footballers
Manchester City F.C. players
Strømsgodset Toppfotball players
Colorado Rapids players
Kuopion Palloseura players
CFR Cluj players
Eliteserien players
Veikkausliiga players
Major League Soccer players
Liga I players
Ghanaian expatriate footballers
Expatriate footballers in Norway
Ghanaian expatriate sportspeople in Norway
Ghanaian expatriate sportspeople in Finland
Expatriate footballers in Finland
Right to Dream Academy players
Association football midfielders